The Mitsubishi 2MB2 or Experimental Washi-type Light Bomber was a prototype Japanese single-engined biplane light bomber of the 1920s. A single example was built for the Imperial Japanese Army, but no production followed.

Design and development
In 1925, the Imperial Japanese Army issued a specification for a single-engined bomber, requesting responses from Mitsubishi, Nakajima and Kawasaki. To design an aircraft to meet this requirement, Mitsubishi hired the German designer Alexander Baumann, a professor at Stuttgart University, and former designer of Riesenflugzeug for Zeppelin-Staaken to supervise the design team, with Nobushiro Nakata as chief designer.

The team led by Baumann and Nakata designed a sesquiplane (i.e. a biplane with the lower wing much smaller than the upper) of mixed wood and metal construction. The high-aspect ratio wings were braced by struts arranged in a "W" shape forming a Warren truss, while the fuselage had a metal structure covered in fabric, carrying the crew of two who sat in open cockpits. The aircraft was powered by a single Mitsubishi Hi V-12 (Hispano-Suiza Lb) V12 engine driving a two-bladed fixed pitch metal propeller and had a fixed conventional landing gear.

The prototype bomber, known as the 2MB2, or Experimental Washi-type Light Bomber (Washi - Eagle), was completed in December 1925. While it demonstrated good performance, and was rated as superior to the proposals from Kawasaki (a modified version of the Dornier Do C) and Nakajima (the Breguet 19) by the Army evaluators, it was considered to too expensive to build owing to its complex structure, and was also rejected. The Japanese Army instead adopted a modified version of Mitsubishi's Navy Type 13 Carrier Attack Aircraft as the Army Type 87 Light Bomber (company designation 2MB1), despite a poorer performance and bombload.

Specifications

Notes

References

2MB2
2MB2, Mitsubishi
Sesquiplanes
Single-engined tractor aircraft